The 2013 Northern Colorado Bears football team represented the University of Northern Colorado in the 2013 NCAA Division I FCS football season. They were led by third-year head coach Earnest Collins Jr. and played their home games at Nottingham Field. They were a member of the Big Sky Conference. They finished the season 1–11, 0–8 in Big Sky play to finish in last place.

Schedule

Game summaries

Langston

CSU-Pueblo

@ Wyoming

Northern Iowa

Southern Utah

@ Sacramento State

@ Idaho State

UC Davis

Montana State

@ North Dakota

@ Northern Arizona

Cal Poly

References

Northern Colorado
Northern Colorado Bears football seasons
Northern Colorado Bears football